The State of Shahpura or Princely State of Shahpura was a princely state in Shahpura, Bhilwara during the era of British India. Its relations with the British were managed by the Rajputana Agency. The last ruler of Shahpura signed the accession to join the Indian Union in 1949.

The Haraoti-Tonk Agency, with headquarters at Deoli, dealt with the states of Tonk and Bundi, as well as with the estate of Shahpura.

History 
In 1629 the Phulia estate jagir was given to a Sisodia prince called Sujan Singh by The Maharana of Mewar. 

Its rulers bore the title of "Raja" but were later bestowed with the title of "Raja Dhiraj" by the Maharana of Mewar. In 1908 the average revenue of the state was Rs.3,00,000. The Raja Dhiraj of Shahpura was entitled to a 9 gun salute.

Raja Dhiraj's
 1706 – 27 December 1729         Bharat Singh                       (d. 1730) 
27 Dec 1729 – 13 January 1769  Umaid Singh I                      (d. 1769) 
14 Jan 1769 – 29 May 1774  Ram Singh                          (d. 1774)
29 May 1774 – 19 May 1796  Bhim Singh                         (b. c.1715 – d. 1796)
19 May 1796 –  7 July 1827  Amar Singh                         (b. 1784 – d. 1827)
19 May 1796 – c. 1802       .... -Regent
 7 July 1827 –  5 June 1845  Madho Singh                        (b. 1813 – d. 1845)
 5 June 1845 – 23 June 1853  Jagat Singh                        (b. 1837 – d. 1853) 
 5 June 1845 – 18..         Rani Khangarotji (f) -Regent
15 Jul 1853 –  21 April 1869  Lakshman Singh                     (b. 1852 – d. 1870) 
23 Jun 1853 – 21 April 1870  Rani Mertaniji (f) -Regent         (b. c.1832 – d. 1916)
21 Apr 1870 – 24 June 1932  Sir Nahar Singh        (b. 1855 – d. 1932) (from 1 January 1903, Sir Nahar Singh)
21 Apr 1870 –  3 March 1876  Rani Mertaniji (f) -Regent         (s.a.)
24 Jun 1932 –  3 February 1947  Umaid Singh II                     (b. 1876 – d. 1955) 
3 Feb 1947 – 15 August 1947  Sudharshandev Singh                (b. 1915 – d. 1992)

See also
Rajputana Agency

References

External links

Bhilwara district
Princely states of Rajasthan
1629 establishments in India
1949 disestablishments in India
States and territories established in 1629
Rajputs